Fergus George Frederick Sheppard (1908 – 1997) was a New Zealand architect, who served as the chief government architect from 1959 until his retirement in 1971. During his time in this capacity he was involved with the design of the Beehive, among hundreds of other public buildings.

Personal life 
Fergus Sheppard was born in 1908 in Auckland, the youngest of two, and son of bootmaker Lewis George Frederick Sheppard and Lillian Gertrude Sheppard (née Green), both first generationers to be born in New Zealand. He attended Auckland Grammar, and then studied at Auckland University. In 1938, he married Marjorie Joan Targuse (1912 – 2008), daughter of Violet Targuse. They had four sons, one of whom was also an architect.

During World War Two, he served as a sapper (a combat engineer) and 1st lieutenant in the 4th Works Company.

He died in 1997.

Professional career 

Sheppard was appointed as acting Government Architect with the Ministry of Works in February 1959, following the sudden death of Gordon Wilson, and fully assumed the role in May 1959. During his tenure there was a boom in construction of state owned buildings, and one estimate is that Sheppard was responsible for approximately 900 building projects, including many government buildings, educational buildings, and state housing. During this period, government architects designed buildings in a post-war modernist style. According to Duncan Joiner, the last to hold the title of Government Architect, "Many of the government buildings of this period are elegantly simple in concept, and economical in their use of materials and services, reflecting a New Zealand architectural design response to stringent import controls. It was a period of inventiveness, and during this time New Zealand engineers and architects established their international reputation for seismic design."

Sheppard produced the detailed architectural drawings of the Beehive, the executive wing of the New Zealand parliament, from the original concept designs by Scottish architect Sir Basil Spence, who is quoted as having remarked "It is not a Spence building, it is a Sheppard Building."

Sheppard retired in 1971.

He was elected a fellow of the Royal Society of Architects in 1969, held public roles as the President of the Royal Society of Arts, and as a member of the Historic Places Trust. He was chairman of the Wellington Branch of the Institute of Architects and went to hold key roles with the New Zealand Institute of Architects at national level.

The "Sheppard collection" held by the Architecture and Planning Library of the University of Auckland, was originally compiled by Sheppard in an effort to collect information on every New Zealand architect.

Works 
Among the buildings which Sheppard personally designed, collaborated on, or supervised the design of are:

References 

20th-century New Zealand architects
1908 births
1997 deaths
People from Auckland
Modernist architects
University of Auckland alumni